The following is the qualification system and qualified countries for the Modern pentathlon at the 2019 Pan American Games competitions.

Qualification system
A total of 64 Modern pentathletes will qualify to compete. Each nation may enter a maximum of 6 athletes (three per gender). Quotas will be awarded across three qualification tournaments. The host nation, Peru, automatically qualifies the four athletes (two per gender). Each country competing at the 2018 South American Games and the 2018 Central American and Caribbean Games along with Canada and the USA qualified one athlete per individual event. The remaining quotas were awarded per second ranked athletes from countries at the 2018 Pan American Championships, and if necessary third ranked athletes.

Qualification timeline

Qualification summary
The following is the final allocation quota.

Men

Women

References

External links
2018 Pan American Championships results

P
Qualification for the 2019 Pan American Games
Modern pentathlon at the 2019 Pan American Games